

The Baltoro Glacier, at  in length, is one of the longest glaciers outside the polar regions. It is located in the Shigar District of Gilgit-Baltistan in Pakistan, home to some of the world’s highest mountains. The glacier runs through the Karakoram mountain range, close to Chogori or K2, the highest mountain in the region at 8,611 meters (28,251 feet). Three other nearby mountains within 20 kilometers are all above 8,000 meters as well.

Geography 

It is located in the Shigar District  Gilgit-Baltistan region of Pakistan. It runs through part of the Karakoram mountain range. The Baltoro Muztagh lies to the north and east of the glacier, while the Masherbrum Mountains lie to the south. At 8,611 m (28,251 ft), K2 is the highest mountain in the region, and three other Eight thousanders within 20 km. Siachen Glacier is separated from the Baltoro glacier by the Conway Saddle (or pass).

The glacier gives rise to the Braldo River which is a tributary of Shigar River, which is a tributary of the Indus River. Several large tributary glaciers feed the main Baltoro Glacier, including the Godwin-Austen Glacier, flowing south from K2; the Abruzzi and the various Gasherbrum Glaciers, flowing from the Gasherbrum group of peaks; the Vigne Glacier, flowing from Chogolisa, and the Yermandendu Glacier, flowing from Masherbrum. The confluence of the main Baltoro Glacier with the Godwin-Austen Glacier is known as Concordia; this location and K2 base camp are popular trekking destinations.

The trough of this glacier is very wide. Small valley glaciers form icefalls where they meet the trunk glacier. The sidewalls vary from very steep to precipitous. The glacier has carved striations on the surrounding country rocks. Moving ice has formed depressions, which serve as basins for numerous glacial lakes.

The glacier can be approached via the Balti town of Skardu.

List of peaks 
A list of notable peaks adjacent to or near the Baltoro Glacier includes:
 Biarchedi, 6,781 m
 Broad Peak, 12th highest in the world at 8,047 m.
 Chogolisa, 36th highest in the world at 7,665 m.
 Gasherbrum III, 7,946 m. (Often regarded as a subpeak of Gasherbrum II.)
 Gasherbrum II, 13th highest in the world at 8,035 m.
 Gasherbrum IV, 17th highest in the world at 7,932 m.
 Gasherbrum I, 11th highest in the world at 8,080 m.
 K2, 2nd highest in the world at 8611m
 Masherbrum (K1), 22nd highest in the world at 7,821 m.
 Mitre Peak, 6,010 m.
 Muztagh Tower, 7,273 m.
 Snow Dome, 7,160 m.
 Trango Towers, 6,286 m. (Their vertical faces are the world's tallest cliffs.)
 Uli Biaho Tower, 6,417 m.

Image gallery

See also 
 Baltoro Muztagh
 Biafo Glacier
 Trango Glacier
 Hainablak Glacier
 Sarpo Laggo Glacier
 Eight-thousander
 List of glaciers
 List of highest mountains
 Northern Areas

References

External links 

 Photos from trekking to K2 over Baltoro by Michael Holtrop
 Photos from Concordia by Kelly Cheng

Baltistan
Glaciers of Gilgit-Baltistan